The 2010 WNBA season is the 3rd season for the Atlanta Dream of the Women's National Basketball Association.

Transactions

Sacramento Monarchs Dispersal Draft
With the Sacramento Monarchs ceasing operation and based on the 2009 records of teams, the Dream selected 9th in the Dispersal Draft. The Dream waived their right to pick and chose nobody.

WNBA Draft

Trades and Roster Changes

Roster
{| class="toccolours" style="font-size: 95%; width: 100%;"
|-
! colspan="2" style="background:#6495ED;color:white;"|2010 Atlanta Dream Roster
|- style="text-align:center; background-color:#FF0000; color:#FFFFFF;"
! Players !! Coaches
|- 
| valign="top" |
{| class="sortable" style="background:transparent; margin:0px; width:100%;"
! Pos. !! # !! Nat. !! Name !! Ht. !! Wt. !! From
|-

Depth

Schedule

Preseason

|- align="center" bgcolor="ffbbbb"
| 1 || May 4 || 11:00am || @ Connecticut || 79-86 || McCoughtry (19) || Price (7) || Price (5) || Mohegan Sun Arena  3,779 || 0-1
|- align="center" bgcolor="ffbbbb"
| 2 || May 9 || 2:00pm || Washington || 58-77 || Castro Marques (13) || McCoughtry (6) || Lehning, Price (3) || Eblen Center  2,219 || 0-2
|-

Regular season

|- align="center" bgcolor="bbffbb"
| 1 || May 15 || 8:00pm || @ San Antonio || FS-SW || 75-70 || Castro Marques (23) || de Souza (15) || Lehning (6) || AT&T Center  9,409 || 1-0
|- align="center" bgcolor="bbffbb"
| 2 || May 16 || 7:00pm || Indiana || SSO || 66-62 || de Souza, Price (14) || de Souza (11) || Miller (6) || Philips Arena  7,337 || 2-0
|- align="center" bgcolor="bbffbb"
| 3 || May 21 || 7:00pm || Connecticut || NBATVFS-SCSN-NE || 97-82 || McCoughtry (32) || Lyttle (17) || Lehning (10) || Philips Arena  4,092 || 3-0
|- align="center" bgcolor="bbffbb"
| 4 || May 23 || 4:00pm || @ New York ||  || 86-77 || McCoughtry (21) || Bales, de Souza (10) || McCoughtry (6) || Madison Square Garden  9,548 || 4-0
|- align="center" bgcolor="bbffbb"
| 5 || May 28 || 10:00pm || @ Phoenix ||  || 96-93 || McCoughtry (28) || Lyttle (17) || Lehning (5) || US Airways Center  7,986 || 5-0
|- align="center" bgcolor="bbffbb"
| 6 || May 30 || 8:00pm || @ Los Angeles ||  || 101-82 || McCoughtry (32) || de Souza (13) || Castro Marques, Lehning (5) || STAPLES Center  8,404 || 6-0
|-

|- align="center" bgcolor="ffbbbb"
| 7 || June 1 || 9:30pm || @ Seattle || ESPN2 || 72-90 || McCoughtry (16) || Lyttle (6) || McCoughtry (3) || KeyArena  7,586 || 6-1
|- align="center" bgcolor="ffbbbb"
| 8 || June 4 || 7:00pm || Chicago || FS-S || 70-80 || Castro Marques (18) || de Souza (7) || Lehning (6) || Philips Arena  2,515 || 6-2
|- align="center" bgcolor="bbffbb"
| 9 || June 5 || 7:00pm || @ Washington ||  || 86-79 (OT) || de Souza, McCoughtry (23) || Lyttle (17) || Castro Marques, K. Miller (6) || Verizon Center  8,986 || 7-2
|- align="center" bgcolor="ffbbbb"
| 10 || June 11 || 7:30pm || @ New York ||  || 79-91 || de Souza (21) || Lyttle (14) || K. Miller (6) || Madison Square Garden  8,332 || 7-3
|- align="center" bgcolor="bbffbb"
| 11 || June 13 || 3:00pm || San Antonio || NBATVSSO || 90-83 || Lyttle (24) || Lyttle (12) || Lehning (8) || Philips Arena  6,050 || 8-3
|- align="center" bgcolor="bbffbb"
| 12 || June 15 || 8:00pm || @ Chicago || CN100 || 93-86 || Castro Marques (31) || de Souza (13) || Lehning (9) || Allstate Arena  3,292 || 9-3
|- align="center" bgcolor="ffbbbb"
| 13 || June 19 || 7:00pm || @ Indiana ||  || 91-94 || Catchings, Douglas (17) || Catchings (7) || Catchings (6) || Conseco Fieldhouse  8,187 || 9-4
|- align="center" bgcolor="bbffbb"
| 14 || June 23 || 12:00pm || Tulsa || NBATVSSOFS-OK || 96-90 || McCoughtry (29) || Lyttle (12) || Castro Marques (8) || Philips Arena  9,598 || 10-4
|- align="center" bgcolor="bbffbb"
| 15 || June 27 || 3:00pm || Los Angeles || NBATVSSO || 89-81 || Castro Marques (25) || Lyttle (11) || Lehning, McCoughtry (5) || Philips Arena  7,855 || 11-4
|- align="center" bgcolor="bbffbb"
| 16 || June 29 || 7:00pm || Phoenix || SSO || 94-88 || McCoughtry (18) || Leuchanka (9) || K. Miller (8) || Philips Arena  4,073 || 12-4
|-

|- align="center" bgcolor="bbffbb"
| 17 || July 1 || 7:00pm || Minnesota || SSO || 76-58 || Castro Marques (22) || Lyttle (14) || Lehning (5) || Philips Arena  4,020 || 13-4
|- align="center" bgcolor="ffbbbb"
| 18 || July 3 || 7:00pm || Chicago || NBATVSSO || 82-88 || McCoughtry (20) || de Souza (15) || Lyttle, K. Miller (3) || Philips Arena  6,920 || 13-5
|- align="center" bgcolor="bbffbb"
| 19 || July 7 || 7:00pm || Connecticut || SSO || 108-103 (OT) || Castro Marques, McCoughtry (32) || de Souza (13) || Lehning (8) || Philips Arena  5,305 || 14-5
|- align="center" bgcolor="ffbbbb"
| 20 || July 14 || 1:00pm || @ Minnesota ||  || 81-83 || McCoughtry (25) || de Souza (20) || Lehning (6) || Target Center  12,311 || 14-6
|- align="center" bgcolor="ffbbbb"
| 21 || July 16 || 7:00pm || @ Indiana ||  || 70-89 || McCoughtry (27) || Leuchanka (7) || Lehning (3) || Conseco Fieldhouse  7,532 || 14-7
|- align="center" bgcolor="ffbbbb"
| 22 || July 17 || 7:00pm || @ Connecticut ||  || 80-96 || McCoughtry (27) || Lyttle (11) || Castro Marques, Price (5) || Mohegan Sun Arena  7,378 || 14-8
|- align="center" bgcolor="ffbbbb"
| 23 || July 21 || 11:30am || @ Washington || NBATVCSN-MA || 72-82 || McCoughtry (23) || Lyttle (8) || Castro Marques (6) || Verizon Center  14,347 || 14-9
|- align="center" bgcolor="bbffbb"
| 24 || July 25 || 3:00pm || New York || NBATVSSO || 82-75 || McCoughtry (28) || de Souza, McCoughtry (10) || McCoughtry (6) || Philips Arena  7,030 || 15-9
|- align="center" bgcolor="bbffbb"
| 25 || July 27 || 1:30pm || @ Tulsa || NBATVCOX || 105-89 || Castro Marques (23) || Lyttle (14) || Lehning (6) || BOK Center  3,800 || 16-9
|- align="center" bgcolor="bbffbb"
| 26 || July 30 || 7:30pm || @ Connecticut ||  || 94-62 || McCoughtry (20) || de Souza (13) || K. Miller, Price (5) || Mohegan Sun Arena  7,003 || 17-9
|-

|- align="center" bgcolor="bbffbb"
| 27 || August 1 || 3:00pm || Indiana || NBATVSSO || 90-74 || Castro Marques (22) || Lyttle (8) || Lehning, McCoughtry (7) || Philips Arena  6,270 || 18-9
|- align="center" bgcolor="ffbbbb"
| 28 || August 3 || 7:30pm || Washington || ESPN2 || 78-86 || McCoughtry (30) || Lyttle (9) || Lehning (6) || Philips Arena  9,072 || 18-10
|- align="center" bgcolor="ffbbbb"
| 29 || August 6 || 7:00pm || @ Indiana ||  || 93-95 || McCoughtry (31) || Lyttle (8) || Lehning (6) || Conseco Fieldhouse  9,214 || 18-11
|- align="center" bgcolor="ffbbbb"
| 30 || August 10 || 7:00pm || Seattle || FS-S || 70-80 || McCoughtry (16) || Lyttle (17) || Lehning (6) || Philips Arena  6,042 || 18-12
|- align="center" bgcolor="ffbbbb"
| 31 || August 13 || 7:00pm || New York || SSO || 83-90 || McCoughtry (22) || Lyttle (13) || Lehning (8) || Philips Arena  6,025 || 18-13
|- align="center" bgcolor="bbffbb"
| 32 || August 14 || 8:00pm || @ Chicago || CN100 || 92-74 || de Souza (17) || Bales (12) || Price (6) || Allstate Arena  4,214 || 19-13
|- align="center" bgcolor="ffbbbb"
| 33 || August 17 || 7:00pm || Chicago || NBATVFS-S || 79-84 || Castro Marques (19) || Leuchanka (11) || Lehning, Miller (4) || Philips Arena  5,209 || 19-14
|- align="center" bgcolor="ffbbbb"
| 34 || August 22 || 3:00pm || Washington || SSO || 81-90 || McCoughtry (19) || Lyttle (11) || Lyttle (6) || Philips Arena  9,570 || 19-15
|-

| All games are viewable on WNBA LiveAccess

Playoffs

|- align="center" bgcolor="bbffbb"
| 1 || August 25 || 7:00pm || @ Washington || NBATV || 95-90 || McCoughtry (28) || de Souza, Lyttle (9) || Price (8) || Verizon Center  10,322 || 1-0 
|- align="center" bgcolor="bbffbb"
| 2 || August 27 || 7:30pm || Washington || NBATVFS-S ||101-77  || McCoughtry, Castro Marques (21) ||Lyttle (10)  || Lehning (9)|| Philips Arena  7,890  || 2-0
|-

|- align="center" bgcolor="bbffbb"
| 1 || September 5 || 7:00pm || @ New York || NBATVMSG || 81-75 || McCoughtry (21) || Lyttle (13) || Lehning (5) || Madison Square Garden  14,248 || 1-0  
|- align="center" bgcolor="bbffbb"
| 2 || September 7 || 7:30pm || New York || NBATVFS-SMSG || 105-93 || McCoughtry (42) || de Souza (6) || Castro Marques (5) || Philips Arena  9,045 || 2-0 
|-

|- align="center" bgcolor="ffbbbb"
| 1 || September 12 || 3:00pm || @ Seattle || ABC || 77-79 || Castro Marques, McCoughtry (19) || Lyttle (14) || Lehning (3) || KeyArena  15,084 || 0-1 
|- align="center" bgcolor="ffbbbb"
| 2 || September 14 || 9:00pm || @ Seattle || ESPN2 || 84-87 || Castro Marques, McCoughtry (21) || McCoughtry (9) || C. Miller (8) || KeyArena  13,898 || 0-2
|- align="center" bgcolor="ffbbbb"
| 3 || September 16 || 8:00pm || Seattle || ESPN2 || 84-87 || McCoughtry (35) || de Souza (14) || C. Miller (5) || Philips Arena  10,522 || 0-3 
|-

Standings

Playoffs

Statistics

Regular Season

Playoffs

Awards and Honors

References

External links

Eastern Conference (WNBA) championship seasons
Atlanta Dream seasons
Atlanta
Atlanta Dream Season, 2010
2010 in Atlanta